The Logar Valley (Logarjeva dolina) is a valley in the Kamnik Alps, in the Municipality of Solčava, Slovenia. The Slovene name for the valley is of relatively recent coinage and is derived from the Logar Farm, which in turn is derived from log (literally, 'swampy meadow'). In 1987, the valley received protected status as a landscape park encompassing .

Geography
The Logar Valley is a typical U-shaped glacial valley. It is divided into three parts. The lower part is named Log, the middle part Plest or Plestje (it is a mostly wooded area), and the upper part Kot (literally 'cirque') or Ogradec (it is a wooded area with scree slopes). Altogether 35 people live on the isolated farmsteads in the valley.

Peaks

The Logar Valley is ringed by the following peaks: Strelovec, Krofička, Ojstrica, Lučka Baba, Planjava, Brana, Turska Gora, and Mrzla Gora. It terminates in a head wall beneath the Okrešelj Cirque, where the Savinja River starts at an ice-cold spring at an elevation of 1,280 meters and flows to Rinka Falls.

Climate
Although the Logar Valley is not particularly narrow (about 500 m at its narrowest), inversions are very common due to the influence of a northern anticyclone. Temperature distributions on the slopes are greatly influenced by differences between the sunny and shady areas, which is seen in different snow and ice conditions in the winter.

A walking path (2–3 hours) through the valley leads past a number of points of interest: the source of Black Creek, wooden logging chutes, a burl-covered ash tree, a charcoal-maker’s hut, and other sights.

References

External links

Upper Savinja Valley: tourism in the Logar Valley and surroundings

 

 
Valleys in Styria (Slovenia)
Landscape parks in Slovenia
Valleys in the Kamnik–Savinja Alps
Savinja basin
Articles containing video clips